Sawdust (or wood dust) is a by-product or waste product of woodworking operations such as sawing, sanding, milling, planing, and routing. It is composed of small chippings of wood. These operations can be performed by woodworking machinery, portable power tools or by use of hand tools.  Wood dust is also the byproduct of certain animals, birds and insects which live in wood, such as the woodpecker and carpenter ant. In some manufacturing industries it can be a significant fire hazard and source of occupational dust exposure.

Sawdust, as particulates, is the main component of particleboard. Research on health hazards comes from the field of occupational safety and health, and study of ventilation happens in indoor air quality engineering.

Formation
Two waste products, dust and chips, form at the working surface during woodworking operations such as sawing, milling and sanding.  These operations both shatter lignified wood cells and break out whole cells and groups of cells. Shattering of wood cells creates dust, while breaking out of whole groups of wood cells creates chips. The more cell-shattering that occurs, the finer the dust particles that are produced. For example, sawing and milling are mixed cell shattering and chip forming processes, whereas sanding is almost exclusively cell shattering.

Uses
A major use of sawdust is for particleboard; coarse sawdust may be used for wood pulp. Sawdust has a variety of other practical uses, including serving as a mulch, as an alternative to clay cat litter, or as a fuel. Until the advent of refrigeration, it was often used in icehouses to keep ice frozen during the summer. It has been used in artistic displays, and as scatter in miniature railroad and other models. It is also sometimes used to soak up liquid spills, allowing the spill to be easily collected or swept aside.  As such, it was formerly common on barroom floors. It is used to make Cutler's resin. Mixed with water and frozen, it forms pykrete, a slow-melting, much stronger form of ice.

Sawdust is used in the manufacture of charcoal briquettes. The claim for invention of the first commercial charcoal briquettes goes to Henry Ford who created them from the wood scraps and sawdust produced by his automobile factory.

Food

Cellulose, fibre starch that is indigestible to humans, and a filler in some low calorie foods, can be and is made from sawdust, as well as from other plant sources. While there is no documentation for the persistent rumor, based upon Upton Sinclair's novel The Jungle, that sawdust was used as a filler in sausage, cellulose derived from sawdust was and is used for sausage casings. Sawdust-derived cellulose has also been used as a filler in bread.

When cereals were scarce, sawdust was sometimes an ingredient in kommissbrot. Auschwitz concentration camp survivor, Dr. Miklós Nyiszli, reports in Auschwitz: A Doctor's Eyewitness Account that the subaltern medical staff, who served Dr. Josef Mengele, subsisted on "bread made from wild chestnuts sprinkled with sawdust."

Health hazards 
Airborne sawdust and sawdust accumulations present a number of health and safety hazards. Wood dust becomes a potential health problem when, for example, the wood particles, from processes such as sanding, become airborne and are inhaled. Wood dust is a known human carcinogen.  Certain woods and their dust contain toxins that can produce severe allergic reactions.

Breathing airborne wood dust may cause allergic respiratory symptoms, mucosal and non-allergic respiratory symptoms, and cancer. In the US, lists of carcinogenic factors are published by the American Conference of Governmental Industrial Hygienists (ACGIH), the Occupational Safety and Health Administration (OSHA), and the National Institute for Occupational Safety and Health (NIOSH). All these organisations recognize wood dust as carcinogenic in relation to the nasal cavities and paranasal sinuses.

People can be exposed to wood dust in the workplace by breathing it in, skin contact, or eye contact. The Occupational Safety and Health Administration (OSHA) has set the legal limit (permissible exposure limit) for wood dust exposure in the workplace as 15 mg/m3 total exposure and 5 mg/m3 respiratory exposure over an 8-hour workday. The National Institute for Occupational Safety and Health (NIOSH) has set a recommended exposure limit (REL) of 1 mg/m3 over an 8-hour workday.

Water-borne bacteria digest organic material in leachate, but use up much of the available oxygen. This high "biological oxygen demand" can suffocate fish and other organisms. There is an equally detrimental effect on beneficial bacteria, so it is not at all advisable to use sawdust within home aquariums, as was once done by hobbyists seeking to save some expense on activated charcoal.

Explosions and fire

Sawdust is flammable and accumulations provide a ready source of fuel.  Airborne sawdust can be ignited by sparks or even heat accumulation and result in explosions.

Environmental effects
At sawmills, unless reprocessed into particleboard, burned in a sawdust burner, or used to make heat for other milling operations, sawdust may collect in piles and add harmful leachates into local water systems, creating an environmental hazard. This has placed small sawyers and environmental agencies in a deadlock.

Questions about the science behind the determination of sawdust being an environmental hazard remain for sawmill operators (though this is mainly with finer particles), who compare wood residuals to dead trees in a forest. Technical advisors have reviewed some of the environmental studies, but say most lack standardized methodology or evidence of a direct impact on wildlife. They don't take into account large drainage areas, so the amount of material that is getting into the water from the site in relation to the total drainage area is minuscule.

Other scientists have a different view, saying the "dilution is the solution to pollution" argument is no longer accepted in environmental science. The decomposition of a tree in a forest is similar to the impact of sawdust, but the difference is of scale. Sawmills may be storing thousands of cubic metres of wood residues in one place, so the issue becomes one of concentration.

But of larger concern are substances such as lignins and fatty acids that protect trees from predators while they are alive, but can leach into water and poison wildlife. Those types of things remain in the tree and, as the tree decays, they slowly are broken down. But when sawyers are processing a large volume of wood and large concentrations of these materials permeate into the runoff, the toxicity they cause is harmful to a broad range of organisms.

Wood flour

Wood flour is finely pulverized wood that has a consistency fairly equal to sand or sawdust, but can vary considerably, with particles ranging in dimensions from a fine powder to roughly that of a grain of rice.  Most wood flour manufacturers are able to create batches of wood flour that have the same consistency throughout.  All high quality wood flour is made from hardwoods because of its durability and strength.  Very low grade wood flour is occasionally made from sapless softwoods such as pine or fir.

Applications
Wood flour is commonly used as a filler in thermosetting resins such as bakelite, and in linoleum floor coverings.  Wood flour is also the main ingredient in wood/plastic composite building products such as decks and roofs.  Prior to 1920, wood flour was used as the filler in ¼-inch thick Edison Diamond Discs.

Wood flour has found a use in plugging small through-wall holes in leaking main condenser (heat exchanger) tubes at electrical power generating stations via injecting small quantities of the wood flour into the cooling water supply lines.  Some of the injected wood flour clogs the small holes while the remainder exits the station in a relatively environmentally benign fashion.

Because of its adsorbent properties it has been used as a cleaning agent for removing grease or oil in various occupations. It has also been noted for its ability to remove lead contamination from water.

Wood flour can be used as a binder in grain filler compounds.

Sources
Large quantities of wood flour are frequently to be found in the waste from woodworking and furniture companies.  An adaptive reuse to which this material can be directed is composting.

Wood flour can be subject to dust explosions if not cared for and disposed of properly.

Respirable particulates 
As with all airborne particulates, wood dust particle sizes are classified with regard to effect on the human respiratory system.  For this classification, the unit for measurement of particle sizes is the micrometre or micron (μm), where 1 micrometre = 1 micron. Particles below 50 μm are not normally visible to the naked human eye. Particles of concern for human respiratory health are those <100 μm (where the symbol < means ‘less than’).

Zhang (2004) has defined the size of indoor particulates according to respiratory fraction:

Particles which precipitate in the vicinity of the mouth and eyes, and get into the organism, are defined as the inhalable fraction, that is total dust. Smaller fractions, penetrating into the non-cartilage respiratory tract, are defined as respirable dust. Dust emitted in the wood industry is characterized by the dimensional disintegration of particles up to 5 μm, and that
is why they precipitate mostly in the nasal cavity, increasing the risk of cancer of the upper respiratory tract.

Exposure 
The parameter most commonly used to characterize exposures to wood dust in air is total wood dust concentration, in mass per unit volume. In countries that use the metric system, this is usually measured in mg/m3 (milligram per cubic metre)

A study to estimate occupational exposure to inhalable wood dust by country, industry, the level of exposure and type of wood dust in 25 member states of the European Union (EU-25) found that in 2000–2003, about 3.6 million workers (2.0% of the employed EU-25 population) were occupationally exposed to inhalable wood dust. The highest exposure levels were estimated to occur in the construction sector and furniture industry.

Cancer 
Wood dust is known to be a human carcinogen, based on sufficient evidence of carcinogenicity from studies in humans. It has been demonstrated through human epidemiologic studies that exposure to wood dust increases the occurrence of cancer of the nose (nasal cavities and paranasal sinuses). An association of wood dust exposure and cancers of the nose has been observed in numerous case reports, cohort studies, and case control studies specifically addressing nasal cancer.

Ventilation
To lower the concentration of airborne dust concentrations during woodworking, dust extraction systems are used. These can be divided into two types. The first are local exhaust ventilation systems, the second are room ventilation systems. Use of personal respirators, a form of personal protective equipment, can also isolate workers from dust.

Local exhaust
Local exhaust ventilation (LEV) systems rely on air pulled with a suction force through piping systems from the point of dust formation to a waste disposal unit. They consist of four elements: dust hoods at the point of dust formation, ventilation ducts, an air cleaning device (waste separator or dust collector) and an air moving device (a fan, otherwise known as an impeller). The air, containing dust and chips from the woodworking operation, is sucked by an impeller. The impeller is usually built into, or placed close to, the waste disposal unit, or dust collector.

Guidelines of performance for woodworking LEV systems exist, and these tie into occupational air quality regulations that exist in many countries. The LEV guidelines often referred to are those set by the ACIAH.

Low volume/high velocity
Low-volume/high-velocity (LVHV) capture systems are specialised types of LEV that use an extractor hood designed as an integral part of the tool or positioned very close to the operating point of the cutting tool. The hood is designed to provide high capture velocities, often greater than 50 m/s (10,000 fpm) at the contaminant release point. This high velocity is accompanied by airflows often less than 0.02m3/s (50 cfm) resulting from the small face area of the hood that is used. These systems have come into favour for portable power tools, although adoption of the technology is not widespread. Festool is one manufacturer of portable power tools using LVHV ventilation integrated into the tool design.

Room
If suitably designed, general ventilation can also be used as a control of airborne dust. General ventilation can often help reduce skin and clothing contamination, and dust deposition on surfaces.

See also 
 Dust collection system
 Swarf

References

External links
BillPentz.com: Dust Collection Research.
WHO 2005. Air Quality Guidelines for Europe, 2nd ed. WHO regional publications. European series, No. 91. Copenhagen: WHO Regional Office for Europe.

Environmental chemistry
Saws
Waste
Woodworking
IARC Group 1 carcinogens
Wood fuel
Wood products
Dust
By-products